The Mt. Harlan AVA is an American Viticultural Area located in San Benito County, California. It is located in the Gabilan Mountains and is part of the larger Central Coast AVA. The AVA was established as the result of a petition to the United States Department of the Treasury Alcohol and Tobacco Tax and Trade Bureau by Josh Jensen and the Calera Wine Company, the only commercial winery in the appellation.

References 

American Viticultural Areas of California
Gabilan Range
Geography of San Benito County, California
American Viticultural Areas
1990 establishments in California